Erika Girardi (née Chahoy; born July 10, 1971), known professionally as Erika Jayne, is an American singer, television personality and former actress.

Early life
Erika Girardi was born in Atlanta, Georgia, on July 10, 1971, to single mother Renee Chahoy. Her parents broke up before her first birthday. She graduated from North Atlanta High School. At 18, she moved to New York City.

Career 
Her first two on-screen appearances were non-speaking roles as Suzanne Morton in the episodes "Prescription for Death" and "The Violence of Summer" in NBC's legal drama series Law & Order. She also had roles in independent films Alchemy (1995) and Lowball (1996).

According to her autobiography Pretty Mess, music producer Peter Rafelson came up with the idea of changing her name to "Erika Jayne"; she disliked it at first Jayne's first single, "Roller Coaster" was released on January 1, 2007. The song placed at number one on the Billboard Hot Dance Club Play chart. Jayne's debut album Pretty Mess, was released in the United States on August 11, 2009.

In 2015, she joined the cast of The Real Housewives of Beverly Hills for the show's sixth season.

Personal life and legal issues 
While living in New York, she met Thomas Zizzo, who was working as a DJ at a club in Manhattan. The couple married in December 1991 at St. Patrick's Cathedral. Soon thereafter she gave birth to a son, Thomas Zizzo Jr. After the couple divorced in 1996, she moved to Los Angeles to pursue her dream of becoming a singer.

In January 2000, she married Thomas Girardi, an attorney in Downtown Los Angeles whom she met in 1998. In November 2020, she announced her separation from Girardi and filed for divorce. One month after the divorce announcement, the couple were named in a lawsuit for allegedly embezzling funds meant for families of the victims of the fatal 2018 Lion Air plane crash. Media outlets reported that the divorce could be a "sham" to hide assets. In December 2020, a Chicago-based law firm asked a federal judge to order Jayne to stop selling designer clothing online amid an effort to recover $2 million in missing money owed to people.

On December 17, 2020, a Los Angeles Times article alleged that Girardi "stole millions of dollars from vulnerable clients," and improperly funneled more than $20 million of victims' compensation to EJ Global, a company set up to finance Jayne’s entertainment and singing career. Two days later, Jayne released an Instagram post revealing text messages and photos of Tom Girardi's alleged mistress, a Californian judge. A documentary about the couple's highly publicized legal troubles titled The Housewife and the Hustler was released on Hulu on June 14, 2021. On August 31, 2022 she scored a legal win in a $5 million dollar fraud lawsuit, where the court found there was no evidence of 'wrong doing' confirmed in New York Posts Page Six article which later on the Los Angeles Times also had confirmed.

Discography

Studio albums

Singles

References

External links

Official website

1971 births
Living people
American dance musicians
Musicians from Atlanta
The Real Housewives cast members
American film actresses
American television actresses
21st-century American actresses
21st-century American singers
21st-century American women singers